Avasirkhva, also known as Aosirkhhvaji, Ajishi , Cherniavkhi  and Shareri ) is a white Abkhazian (Georgian) vine grape.

See also 
Georgian wine
List of Georgian wine appellations

References

Bibliography 

Grape varieties of Georgia
Georgian wine